Family Reunion is the world's first "virtual" country music band. It is composed of six anonymous American musicians and composers living in Virginia, Tennessee, Texas, and California. A majority of the songs were composed by Brian Rock (BMI) and Chris Spradling (BMI) who first worked together in Roanoke, Virginia. The duo also had submissions with American Idol.

Background
In 2010, Family Reunion released the single Blue Collar King. The members live in different parts of the US. 

The six professional musicians and songwriters in Family Reunion have over 50 years of experience in the music industry. But, tired of playing On the Road Again on the road for so long, they had individually decided to settle down with more stable gigs including session work and sound production for film. Then, a chance discussion at an actual family reunion united the six individual musicians into a single, country-wide band.

In 2010, Family Reunion were awarded platinum and gold “Auddys” from the music review site Uplaya.com. In 2011, their singles “A Hard Man (Is Good To Find)” and “Yes” reached the top 40 charts of the European ECMA. In 2012, their debut CD, Family Album, was released. The album received a short review in The Dallas Morning News (rated "B"). Later that year, Family Reunion was nominated for 3 ICoMA Awards (Song of the Year, Album of the Year and Best Country Band.) In June 2012, they were presented with the award for the Independent Country Music Association (ICoMA) Album of the Year.

Discography

Singles
 Blue Collar King (2010)
 A Hard Man (Is Good to Find) (2010)
 Yes (2011)

Albums
 Family Album (2011)
Tracks:
 Blue Collar King
 A Hard Man (Is Good to Find)
 Judy My Dear
 Beautiful Judas
 Yes
 Hey Broken Hearted
 Dulcita
 Delores
 Peas Porridge Cold

Awards
 2012 ICMA Country Album of the Year

Nominations
 2012 ICMA Song of the Year: Yes
 2012 ICMA Country Album of the Year: Family Album
 2012 ICMA Best Country Band: Family Reunion

Other accolades
 Platinum Auddy issued by music analysis site UPlaya for Blue Collar King
 God Auddy issued by music analysis site UPlaya for A Hard Man (Is Good to Find)
 ECMA top 30 song “A Hard Man (Is Good To Find)” in Italy and Norway (January 28th, 2011)
 ECMA top 40 song “Yes” in Italy (April 22, 2011)

References

External links
 

Country musicians from Texas
Country musicians from Virginia
Country musicians from Tennessee
Country musicians from California